Beighton Cup is a field hockey tournament organized by Hockey Bengal (formerly the Bengal Hockey Association). Instituted in 1895, it is one of the oldest field hockey tournaments in the world and is held every year in Kolkata.

History

Aristocratic 19th century origins
Instituted in 1895, the tournament's origins are steeped in both the  era of  British colonialism  and  the English aristocracy. The tournament was  named after its British donor, Judge Thomas  Durant Beighton of the Indian Civil Service and Legal Remembrancer to the Government of Bengal. Born in 1846, Beighton died in Gibraltar of heart failure in February 1906.
  
He later published his accounts as  a motoring enthusiast; a sport, like cricket, that he enjoyed with  his brother-in-law, John Alfred Middleton, MC, whose  wedding to  T.P.D. Beighton's sister, Dorothea,  in London at St Peter's Church, Eaton Square had featured on the front page of the Daily Mirror on 5 January 1922. T.P.D. Beighton and Middleton  had been boarders together at  Winchester and  then  enlisted during WWI following which they both entered Christ Church, Oxford as freshmen in 1919. T.P.D. Beighton's wife, Kathleen Muriel Beighton (née Hood),  was the daughter of Sir Joseph Hood, 1st Baronet, a great benefactor of sport and playing fields.

Recent decades
Today, the Beighton Cup  hockey tournament  is organised by Hockey Bengal, previously  called the Bengal Hockey Association and used to be held on natural grass at the Mohun Bagan ground on the Maidan in Kolkata (earlier called Calcutta) in India. For last few years, it has been held on Astro Turf (artificial grass) at Sports Authority of India (SAI East) in Kolkata. The Beighton Cup was initially organized  by the Indian Football Association, until the Bengal Hockey Association took over in 1905.

In the 1940s and 1950s, Bengal had strong teams in Kolkata such as Customs and Port Commissioners, and Bengal-Nagpur Railway in Kharagpur. It went on to win the 1952 national hockey championship held in Kolkata, defeating Punjab.

Dhyan Chand remembers
In his autobiography Goal!, the legendary Dhyan Chand remembers his Beighton Cup debut. He says, "In my opinion it is perhaps the best organised hockey event in the country. Kolkata is indeed lucky that it has at least three or four first class hockey grounds on the maidan, and this is a great advantage to run a tournament on schedule. Instituted in 1895, this tournament has had a non-stop run. World Wars I and II did not affect the tournament. Threats of Japanese bombs and actual bombings in Kolkata while the hockey season was on also did not prevent the tournament from being held. That being said, it is sad to think that the tournament had to yield to the communal frenzy which gripped the nation in 1946–47."

Hockey in Kolkata
Apart from the Beighton Cup, Kolkata had many firsts in hockey to its credit. The first hockey association in India was formed in 1908 — the Bengal Hockey Association. The first national hockey championship of India was held in 1928. It was called the inter-provincials, with 5 provinces of undivided India participating. The first Indian Olympic team for the Amsterdam Games was selected in Kolkata after the 1928 nationals.

Twenty-seven Olympic gold medals, two silver medals and one bronze medal ~ that is what Bengal's hockey can boast of. However, all that is history and Kolkata no longer has a hockey Olympian. Despite its pioneering role in the history of Indian hockey, Kolkata is the only major metropolis in India without an artificial turf. "How can you hope to produce international class players if you cannot give the players astroturf to play on?" asks Gurbux Singh, secretary of the Bengal Hockey Association. Leslie Claudius agreed that the absence of astroturf is responsible for this decline, but added: "Ours was a different era. We were successful, so the enthusiasm for the game was naturally high. How can you have that today? Even the educational institutions are not interested in hockey nowadays. But you can’t blame them. Young people don't find hockey exciting enough. Maybe if we can give them astroturf, the fast surface can lure them back into the game."

Big names
Leslie Claudius was the biggest name in Kolkata hockey; he played for Customs in Kolkata, and won 4 Olympic medals from 1948 to 1960 (3 gold, 1 silver).

Results
The results of the Beighton Cup:

Performance by teams

References

Further reading
 (Published online: "Routledge Contemporary South Asia"; 1 July 2010).

Sport in Kolkata
Field hockey in West Bengal
Recurring sporting events established in 1895
Field hockey cup competitions in India